This is a list of adult fiction books that topped The New York Times Fiction Best Seller list in 1983.

See also

 New York Times Nonfiction Best Sellers of 1983
 1983 in literature
 Lists of The New York Times Fiction Best Sellers
 Publishers Weekly list of bestselling novels in the United States in the 1980s

References

1983
.
1983 in the United States